Michael Stich defeated Andrei Chesnokov in the final, 6–3, 6–7(1–7), 7–6(9–7), 6–4 to win the 1993 Hamburg European Open.

Stefan Edberg was the defending champion, but was defeated by Emilio Sánchez in the third round.

Seeds
A champion seed is indicated in bold text while text in italics indicates the round in which that seed was eliminated.

  Stefan Edberg (third round)
  Boris Becker (third round)
  Ivan Lendl (quarterfinals)
  Sergi Bruguera (withdrew)
  Michael Chang (second round)
  Michael Stich (champion)
  Richard Krajicek (quarterfinals)
  Karel Nováček (third round)
  Wayne Ferreira (first round)
  Guy Forget (first round)
  Thomas Muster (third round)
  Carlos Costa (first round)
  Marc Rosset (second round, withdrew)
  Marcos Ondruska (third round)
  Magnus Larsson (first round)
  Emilio Sánchez (semifinals)

Draw

 NB: The Final was the best of 5 sets.

Finals

Top half

Section 1

Section 2

Bottom half

Section 3

Section 4

References

External links
 1993 ATP German Open draw

Singles